María Esteve Flores (born 30 December 1974) is a Spanish actress.

Biography 
Esteve was born on 30 December 1974 in Mar del Plata, Argentina. She is the eldest daughter of actress Pepa Flores and dancer Antonio Gades. Her sister is the singer Celia Flores.

Esteve had her film debut in the 1996 film Not Love, Just Frenzy.

She has since appeared in several films, commercials, and TV shows, including the series Doctor Mateo. In 1998, Esteve was nominated for a Goya Award for Best New Actress, for her role in Nothing in the Fridge. She was nominated again for a Goya in 2003, for her supporting role in The Other Side of the Bed.

In July 2011, Esteve married a man who has remained anonymous to the public as of January 2012.

Filmography

References

External links 
https://web.archive.org/web/20110521044631/http://www.mariaesteve.net/    Official María Esteve Fan Club (in Spanish)
 

Spanish film actresses
1974 births
Living people
Spanish television actresses
20th-century Spanish actresses
21st-century Spanish actresses